Alderman Lawrence Dambudzo Mudehwe (26 July 1933 – 10 August 2022) was a former mayor of Mutare. He was the first Executive Mayor to be elected as an independent candidate in Zimbabwe. He served as Executive mayor for thirteen years.

References

External links 
  Lawrence Mudehwe

Mutare
People from Manicaland Province
Mayors of places in Zimbabwe
Movement for Democratic Change – Tsvangirai politicians
1933 births
2022 deaths